Tajiri (written: 田尻 lit. "end of a field") may refer to:

Tajiri (surname)
Tajiri, Osaka
Tajiri, Miyagi
Shinkichi Tajiri (1923–2009), Japanese American artist, concentration camp inmate, and veteran of the 442nd Regimental Combat Team
Yoshihiro Tajiri (born 1970), a Japanese professional wrestler commonly known as simply Tajiri